was a town located in Katori District, Chiba Prefecture, Japan.

Omigawa has been settled since prehistoric times, with numerous shell middens and burial mounds from the Japanese Paleolithic through Kofun period. During the Edo period, it was the center of Omigawa Domain, a feudal domain of the Tokugawa shogunate. Modern Omigawa Town was created in the early Meiji period.

On March 27, 2006, Omigawa, along with the city of Sawara, and the towns of Kurimoto and Yamada (both from Katori District), was merged to create the city of Katori, and thus no longer exists as an independent municipality.

In November 2005 (the last data available before its merger into Katori), the town had an estimated population of 25,420 and a population density of 411 persons per km². Its total area was 61.84 km².

External links
Katori official site 

Dissolved municipalities of Chiba Prefecture
Katori, Chiba